Josef Hofbauer (20 February 1901 – 12 January 1968) was an Austrian footballer. He played in three matches for the Austria national football team in 1924.

References

External links
 

1901 births
1968 deaths
Austrian footballers
Austria international footballers
Place of birth missing
Association footballers not categorized by position